Stone Park is a village in Cook County, Illinois, United States. The population was 4,576 at the 2020 census. Incorporated in 1939, the town was named for insurance magnate Clement Stone, who bought most of the land when it was still corn fields.

Geography
Stone Park is located at  (41.904330, -87.880486).

Politics
Current Elected Officials

Demographics
As of the 2020 census there were 4,576 people, 1,350 households, and 1,238 families residing in the village. The racial makeup of the village was 15.47% White, 3.52% African American, 2.12% Native American, 0.96% Asian, 0.02% Pacific Islander, 54.28% from other races, and 23.62% from two or more races. Hispanic or Latino of any race were 89.31% of the population.

There were 1,350 households, out of which 98.30% had children under the age of 18 living with them, 60.81% were married couples living together, 26.52% had a female householder with no husband present, and 8.30% were non-families. 5.85% of all households were made up of individuals, and 2.30% had someone living alone who was 65 years of age or older. The average household size was 3.63 and the average family size was 3.59.

The village's age distribution consisted of 30.9% under the age of 18, 10.7% from 18 to 24, 32.2% from 25 to 44, 22% from 45 to 64, and 4.3% who were 65 years of age or older. The median age was 33.1 years. For every 100 females, there were 101.2 males. For every 100 females age 18 and over, there were 102.2 males.

The median income for a household in the village was $63,710, and the median income for a family was $46,944. Males had a median income of $35,062 versus $23,848 for females. The per capita income for the village was $19,125. About 15.9% of families and 17.5% of the population were below the poverty line, including 32.0% of those under age 18 and 16.0% of those age 65 or over.

Education
Bellwood School District 88 operates elementary schools. Students attend Grant Primary and Grant Elementary Schools.

Proviso Township High Schools District 209 operates public high schools. The community is served by Proviso West High School in Hillside. Stone Park residents may apply to Proviso Math & Science Academy in Forest Park.

History
In 2014 the Village of Stone Park  celebrated its 75th anniversary. On April 26, 1939, the Village of Stone Park was incorporated. Since then, it has grown from 50 homes to over 800 homes and from hundreds of residents to thousands, of which many still live in the Village from the day of incorporation.

In 2013 the Missionary Sisters of St. Charles Borromeo Scalabrinians and community residents in Stone Park celebrated victory in preventing a strip club, called Get It, from opening next to the convent.

In 2010, a strip club developer sued the village, alleging that officials had tried to extort cash and part ownership of the club in exchange for approval to build the facility. Although most of the village ordinances were unchallenged by the suit, the village agreed to repeal or amend some ordinances as part of a settlement. These included a local ordinance similar to the state statute that created a  buffer zone between adult entertainment businesses and schools, parks, churches and residential areas.
The Stone Park mayor said that the village chose not to defend against the lawsuit because it would cost $500,000.

Notable residents of Stone Park have included Screen Actors Guild actor and author Ted Zalewski, foremost U.S. interpreter of Teddy Roosevelt.

References

External links
Village of Stone Park Official Website
Stone Park Police Department
Stone Park Fire Fighters
Northlake Public Library District

Villages in Illinois
Villages in Cook County, Illinois
Chicago metropolitan area
Populated places established in 1939
1939 establishments in Illinois